Helena Fourment with her son Frans is a c.1635 painting by Peter Paul Rubens, showing his second wife Helena Fourment holding their second son Frans (born 12 July 1633). , it is in the Alte Pinakothek in Munich.

External links
https://web.archive.org/web/20141104080530/http://www.pinakothek.de/en/peter-paul-rubens

Portraits by Peter Paul Rubens
Portraits of women
1635 paintings
17th-century portraits
Portraits by Dutch artists
Collection of the Alte Pinakothek
Paintings of children